Warm Springs is a 2005 made-for-television biography drama film directed by Joseph Sargent, written by Margaret Nagle, and starring Kenneth Branagh, Cynthia Nixon, Kathy Bates, Tim Blake Nelson, Jane Alexander, and David Paymer. The screenplay concerns U.S. President Franklin D. Roosevelt's 1921 illness, diagnosed at the time as polio, his struggle to overcome paralysis, his discovery of the Warm Springs resort, his work to turn it into a center for the rehabilitation of polio victims, and his resumption of his political career. Roosevelt's emotional growth as he interacts with other disabled people at Warm Springs prepares him for the challenges he will face as President during the Great Depression.

Plot
The film begins with a scene of the 1920 presidential election, in which Harvard educated lawyer, New York assemblyman and assistant Secretary of the Navy Franklin D. Roosevelt makes a rousing speech mentioning his cousin Teddy. Roosevelt is the vice presidential candidate on the ticket with James Cox. They are overwhelmingly defeated by Republican Warren Harding but the seeds are planted for Roosevelt's rise to greatness . In the beginning, he is portrayed as rather arrogant looked upon as a lightweight by opponents (they mock his initials FDR as standing for feather duster).

His wife Eleanor discovers evidence of an affair and it is only the intervention of Roosevelt's domineering mother that prevents a divorce, however Eleanor is never able to forgive him and they only have a marriage of convenience. Roosevelt's friend and political advisor Louis Howe is determined to make him the President of the United States. However, Roosevelt is crippled by polio and forced to accept the possibility that he may never walk again.

Devastated and refusing to be a burden, Roosevelt takes two employees of his named Stanley and Eugene and moves to Florida when he starts living on a house boat. He lives this way until the September 1924 when a storm wreaks the boat. After taking shelter at a nearby restaurant, Louis visits Franklin to persuade him to return to New York with him to resume his political career. However, Franklin finds a letter from George Foster Peabody, an old friend who invites Franklin to Meriweather Inn, a resort he owns in Warm Springs Georgia, claiming a crippled boy regained his ability to walk by swimming in the pool at his resort. Intrigued, Franklin heads to Warm Springs, Georgia with Eleanor in tow.

There he meets Tom Loyless and the Collier Brothers Roy and Pete who escort him to the Meriweather Inn. Tom initially offers the Roosevelts a two story cottage which Franklin rejects on the due to the fact his condition has given him a fear of fire and he can't get out of a building in time if it catches fire if he's upstairs. Tom moves them to a one story cottage. Franklin asks Roy to stay on as his valet. Tom takes the Roosevelts to the pool where Franklin can't even stand but Tom assures him he will if he spends time in the pool. Eleanor realizes this is why Franklin wanted to come to Georgia and that he intends to stay.

Repulsed by how different how different things are in Georgia from New York and horrified by the idea of her husband living in such a rat trap like Meriweather Inn, Eleanor tries to persuade her husband to return to New York City by telling Franklin that New York has the best doctors and hospitals in the county but Franklin, still refusing to be a burden and believing he has a chance to walk again, refuses to leave but agrees to let Eleanor return home.

Eleanor returns to New York where Louis helps her launch a career as an activist. Meanwhile, Franklin becomes able to stand and move around in the pool, gets interviewed and makes a speech to a class. Franklin feels they were pitying him but Tom assures him that because of how things are for most people in Georgia most people don't even care about his legs.

When Christmas approaches, Tom insists that Franklin go home. When Spring comes, Franklin returns to the resort with Roy where he discovers that thanks to the interview he gave other victims of polio have arrived to regain their ability to walk prompting Franklin to storm out. Tom angrily tells Franklin off for his behavior by telling him "This isn't your private spa! I have a business to run!" Tom also calls Franklin out on the fact he looks at them with the same revulsion and pity as everyone else and his ignorance for not knowing what they went through to get to Warm Springs by stating  "You don't want to be around them because that would make you one of them."

Franklin discovers exactly what Tom means when he arrives at the train station. Before he can get on a train for New York, Tom arrives to pick up a victim of polio named Fred Botts. Much to his horror, Franklin learns that Fred was forced to ride in the baggage car on the train that brought him to Warm Springs and hadn't eaten for two days just because he had polio. Franklin protests this to the conductor who dismisses what he says out of both prejudice and ignorance. Tom and Franklin take Fred back to the resort where Franklin nurses him back to health due to the fact that the nearest hospital is all the way in Atlanta and the closest doctor is also too far away. Tom informs Franklin that, due to concerns from the able bodied folk, he can't use the pool during regular hours or eat in the dining room.

Later, a physical therapist named Helena Mahonny arrives at the resort due to reading the interview Franklin gave. Helena examines Franklin and tells him the waters are helping him but that to be able to walk again he needs to spend more time in the pool than he's allowed. This inspires Franklin to decide to buy the resort and turn it into a rehab center for those who caught polio.

Tom tells Franklin he discovered he has cancer while he was away and goes home to die in his own bed. Franklin's mother, who never understood what Franklin is trying to do at Warm Springs, sends Louis and Eleanor to the resort to prevent Franklin's purchase and bring him back to New York. However, upon arriving, Eleanor instantly becomes supportive and together with Franklin gets a doctor sent to the resort.

Louis meanwhile believes that Franklin is ready to resume his political career and persuades the Democratic Party to have Franklin nominate Al Smith for President and ensure Franklin can get elected Governor of New York. Meanwhile, Franklin receives that doctor's report and it's not favorable. Upset that his plans to turn the resort into a rehab center for polio victims and regain his ability to walk again is in danger of being derailed, Franklin sinks into despair.

However Helena, Louis, and Eleanor snap Franklin out of it by telling Franklin he can fulfill his plans if he resumes his political career and gets elected. To ensure he can appear in public without riding in a wheelchair and on crutches, they come up with plan to enable Franklin to move without them with he arm strength, a cane, and his son Elliot. The plan works and Franklin resumes his political career and gets elected Governor of New York.

The epilogue reveals that Franklin got elected President four years later becoming the only President to serve more than two terms and served until he died in his cottage at Warm Springs in 1945. The recipient of his life insurance policy was the rehab center he founded there which continues to operate to this day.

Cast

Actress Jane Alexander, who plays FDR's mother Sara Delano Roosevelt, also played Eleanor Roosevelt in the acclaimed 1976 telefilm Eleanor and Franklin and its 1977 sequel Eleanor and Franklin: The White House Years. Many of the bit part actors in the film are actually physically disabled, though Branagh and several other of the principal actors are not. The withered appearance of Branagh's legs was achieved through the use of CGI.

Production
The film was produced by HBO Films and directed by Joseph Sargent. The majority of the film was made at Warm Springs, Georgia and its surrounding locations. Other Georgia locations include Madison, Atlanta, and Gainesville.

The producers strove to make sure that many of the physical details were as authentic as possible. For example, Kenneth Branagh, as Roosevelt, is seen driving the very same specially-equipped automobile that FDR was taught to drive at Warm Springs. The cottage that Roosevelt stays in during the film is one of the cottages that the real FDR stayed in. And the swimming pool in which the patients swim in is the actual therapeutic swimming pool at Warm Springs, refurbished specifically for the film.

Reception
Tom Jicha of the South Florida Sun-Sentinel found the film "more educational than entertaining", but said "Kenneth Branagh offers an exemplary turn". Rob Owens of the Pittsburgh Post-Gazette said, ""Warm Springs" isn't a revolutionary or ground-breaking film, but it is a solid depiction of a time in the life of a figure who loomed large in 20th century American history." Sid Smith of the Chicago Tribune said that Branagh and Nixon "play these familiar icons as real, flesh-and-blood people", and also noted memorable work by Paymer, Bates, and Nelson. Kevin McDonough of United Feature Syndicate called the film "intimate and powerful".

Hal Boedeker of the Orlando Sentinel takes some issue with some of the writing, but says the film is "impressive" and that " Tim Blake Nelson is heart-rending as the spa's proprietor." He also noted that before Roosevelt died at Warm Springs, he listed the rehabilitation center as beneficiary of his $562,000 life insurance policy.

Accolades

See also
 Franklin D. Roosevelt's paralytic illness
 Warm Springs Historic District
 Sunrise at Campobello, 1958 play
 Sunrise at Campobello, 1960 film

Notes

References

External links

 
 
 
 "New look at New Dealer", LA Times review

2005 television films
2005 films
2005 biographical drama films
HBO Films films
Works about polio
Films set in Georgia (U.S. state)
Films directed by Joseph Sargent
Films about presidents of the United States
Cultural depictions of Franklin D. Roosevelt
Cultural depictions of Eleanor Roosevelt
American biographical drama films
Films about Franklin D. Roosevelt
Films about infectious diseases
Primetime Emmy Award for Outstanding Made for Television Movie winners
Films scored by Bruce Broughton
2000s English-language films
2000s American films
Films about disability